Pavel Sergeyevich Garannikov (born 23 August 1985) is a former Russian professional football player.

Club career
He played in the Russian Football National League for FC Chita in 2009.

External links
 
 

1985 births
Living people
Russian footballers
Association football forwards
FC Torpedo Moscow players
FC Baikal Irkutsk players
FC Volgar Astrakhan players
FC Chita players